Locust Grove is a historic home located at Charlottesville, Virginia. It was built between 1840 and 1844, and is a two-story, five-bay, Georgian style brick dwelling. It has a hipped roof and end chimneys.  On the front facade is a portico with coupled paneled columns.  Also on the property are a contributing original kitchen and smokehouse.

It was listed on the National Register of Historic Places in 1982.  It is located in the Martha Jefferson Historic District.

References

External links
Locust Grove Kitchen, 810 Locust Avenue, Charlottesville, Charlottesville, VA: 6 measured drawings and 7 data pages at Historic American Buildings Survey

Historic American Buildings Survey in Virginia
Houses on the National Register of Historic Places in Virginia
Georgian architecture in Virginia
Houses completed in 1844
Houses in Charlottesville, Virginia
National Register of Historic Places in Charlottesville, Virginia
Individually listed contributing properties to historic districts on the National Register in Virginia